is a Japanese manga series written by Hato and illustrated by Masaki Kawakami. It has been serialized in Media Factory's Monthly Comic Alive magazine since December 2014. The series is licensed and published in North America by Seven Seas Entertainment.

Characters

Media

Manga
The original manga is serialized in Media Factory's Monthly Comic Alive magazine. The first chapter was published in the magazine's December 2014 issue. Kadokawa released the first tankōbon volume on September 19, 2015. Seven Seas Entertainment have licensed and released the volumes in English starting from February 2017.

See also
Apparently, Disillusioned Adventurers Will Save the World - a light novel series whose manga adaptation is illustrated by Masaki Kawakami.

References

External links

Comedy anime and manga
Media Factory manga
Seinen manga
Seven Seas Entertainment titles
Supernatural anime and manga